The Polish 26th Infantry Division was a unit of the Polish Army.  Originally formed as the 4th Infantry Division (Poland) in southern Poland in April 1919, the division was renamed the 26th Infantry Division in 1921.  The division would see combat in World War II, being destroyed during the German invasion of Poland in September 1939.

History 
The 4th Infantry Division was formed after World War I and the foundation of Poland.  Raised in the former Austrian province of Galicia, its regiments were originally stationed in such towns as Cieszyn, Jarosław and Przemyśl.

In 1921 as part of the army's reorganization, the division was renamed the 26th Infantry Division and moved north to Skierniewice and its vicinity.  It consisted of these regiments:
 10th Infantry Regiment, stationed in Łowicz,
 18th Infantry Regiment, stationed in Skierniewice,
 37th Infantry Regiment, stationed in Kutno,
 26th Light Artillery Regiment, stationed in Skierniewice.

During the Invasion of Poland, the Division, under Colonel Adam Brzechwa-Ajdukiewicz, was part of Poznań Army, but on the fifth day of the war it was moved to Pomorze Army and, together with the 15th I.D., it created Operational Group of General Zdzisław Przyjałkowski.

On September 6, 1939, the division was in the area of Inowrocław, soon afterwards it was used in the Battle of the Bzura, covering eastern wing of the Pomorze Army. After initial success of Polish offensive, during which the Division recaptured several locations, the Germans organized a counterattack. The 26th I.D. was subsequently destroyed.

See also
 Polish army order of battle in 1939
 Polish contribution to World War II
 List of Polish divisions in World War II

26th
26th
Military units and formations established in 1919
Łódź Voivodeship (1919–1939)
Military units and formations disestablished in 1939